The common bent-wing bat (Miniopterus schreibersii), also known as the Schreibers's long-fingered bat or Schreibers's bat, is a species of insectivorous bat.  They appear to have dispersed from a subtropical origin and distributed throughout the southern Palearctic, Ethiopic, Oriental, and Australian regions. In Europe, it is present in the southern half on the continent from Iberia to the Caucasus, with the largest populations found in the warmer Mediterranean area. The common and scientific names honor Carl Franz Anton Ritter von Schreibers.

Taxonomy
There are 13 recognised subspecies of the common bent-winged bat.
 Miniopterus schreibersii schreibersii
 Miniopterus schreibersii bassanii (southern bent-wing bat): Found in southeastern Australia, this subspecies is critically endangered.
 Miniopterus schreibersii blepotis
 Miniopterus schreibersii chinensis
 Miniopterus schreibersii dasythrix
 Miniopterus schreibersii eschscholtzii
 Miniopterus schreibersii haradai
 Miniopterus schreibersii japoniae
 Miniopterus schreibersii orianae (northern bent-wing bat) Found in northeastern Western Australia and the Northern Territory.
 Miniopterus schreibersii orsinii
 Miniopterus schreibersii parvipes
 Miniopterus schreibersii smitianus
 Miniopterus schreibersii villiersi

Three former subspecies that were included in M.scheibersii have now been given species status. They are Miniopterus fuliginosus (eastern bent-wing bat), Miniopterus oceanensis (Australasian bent-wing bat) and Miniopterus pallidus (Pale Bent-wing Bat).

Roosting

The common bent-wing bat is a bat that forms major colonies and the longest period of torpor (hibernation) observed was about 12 days. These colonies can range anywhere from a few dozen or several million bats. Most of these colonies are formed in large caves or mines but they can also be found in other areas such as tunnels or ruins or other man made sites. In these roosting sites the common bent-wing bat establishes its colony in a "bell-shaped" hollow, which traps body heat and raises the temperature of the roost higher than the surrounding portions of the cave. This method of trapping warmth is used to reduce energy loss from shivering. Also, they will often enter hollows through small openings in order to better secure themselves from large predators during torpor. The common bent-wing bat migrates multiple times a year depending on weather of the roosting area; the length of these migrations can vary but the longest migration recorded was 833 km.

Threats
The common bent-wing bat is categorized as "near threatened" according to the International Union for Conservation of Nature. The explanation for the recent cause of these deaths is unknown but there have been many speculations as to why the mortality rate for this bat has increased. Researchers in Europe believe that the loss of underground habitats, the disturbance of their habitats, and pesticide use have caused an increase in deaths for the common bent-wing bat. In Australia, researchers suspect that the high tissue levels of DDT (Dichlorodiphenyltrichloroethane) they found in the common bent-wing bat, including the young ones that had not left the maternity roosts, was the cause of these deaths.

Distribution

The common bent-wing bat can be found in the following countries:Afghanistan, Albania, Algeria, Armenia, Australia, Austria, Azerbaijan, Bosnia and Herzegovina, Bulgaria, Cameroon, China, Croatia, Cyprus, possibly Ethiopia, France, Georgia, Gibraltar, Greece, Guinea, Hungary, India, Indonesia, Iran, Iraq, Israel, Italy, Japan, Jordan, possibly Kenya, North Korea, South Korea, Laos, Lebanon, Liberia, Libya, Malaysia, Malta, Montenegro, Morocco, Myanmar, Nepal, Nigeria, North Macedonia, Pakistan, Palestine, Papua New Guinea, Philippines, Portugal, Romania, Russian Federation, San Marino, Saudi Arabia, Serbia, Sierra Leone, Slovakia, Slovenia, Solomon Islands, Spain, Sri Lanka, Switzerland, Syrian Arab Republic, Taiwan, Tajikistan, Thailand, Tunisia, Turkey, Turkmenistan, Vietnam, and Yemen.

The bat appears to have become established for the first time in Poland in 2018 indicating a northerly expansion of the despite a trend in decreasing population in Europe.

References

External links

 Schreibers's bent-winged bat (Science For Nature Foundation)

Miniopteridae
Bats of Africa
Bats of Asia
Bats of Europe
Bats of Oceania
Bats of Southeast Asia
Bats of Australia
Bats of Indonesia
Bats of Malaysia
Mammals of Afghanistan
Mammals of Azerbaijan
Mammals of Ethiopia
Mammals of India
Mammals of Japan
Mammals of Korea
Mammals of Nepal
Bats of New Guinea
Mammals of Pakistan
Mammals of Papua New Guinea
Mammals of Sri Lanka
Mammals of Western New Guinea
Mammals of Western Australia
Mammals of the Northern Territory
Mammals of Queensland
Mammals of Victoria (Australia)
Mammals of Uganda
Mammals described in 1817
Taxonomy articles created by Polbot